Linards is a commune in the Haute-Vienne department in the Nouvelle-Aquitaine region in west-central France.

Geography
The river Briance forms part of the commune's southern border.

Inhabitants are known as Linardais.

The commune of Linards has an area of 36.3 km2. The nearest large city is Limoges, which is located 34 km to the northwest.

See also
Communes of the Haute-Vienne department

References

Communes of Haute-Vienne